"Bag Talk" is a song by American rapper Polo G, released on October 28, 2022, alongside a music video. It was produced by Southside and TM88.

Background
In an interview with Rolling Stone, Polo G stated he made the song around February 2022, during studio sessions with Southside.

Composition
"Bag Talk" is a drill song, in which Polo G raps about street life and his origins, combining elements of his introspective and blustery rapping styles.

Music video
The music video was directed by Caleb Jermale. It opens with Polo G and his friends roaming in their stomping grounds in Chicago. Polo is then seen at a jewelry store and on a private jet.

Charts

References

2022 singles
2022 songs
Polo G songs
Song recordings produced by Southside (record producer)
Songs written by Polo G
Songs written by Southside (record producer)
Songs written by TM88
Columbia Records singles